Hourglass is the debut novel by British writer Keiran Goddard. It was published in the UK by Hachette, Little, Brown and by E/O in Italy and the United States, the novel was listed for the Desmond Elliott Prize, and praised by The Guardian, The Financial Times, The New Statesman and The Irish Times. The sequel, I See Buildings Fall Like Lightning, will be published internationally in 2023.

References 

2022 British novels
Hachette Book Group books
Little, Brown and Company books
2022 debut novels